The GP2X Caanoo, more commonly known as Caanoo, stylized CAANOO, is an open source, Linux-based handheld video game console and portable media player developed by the South Korean company GamePark Holdings. It was released on August 16, 2010 in South Korea and were also sold throughout Europe. It is the successor to the GP2X Wiz, and was showcased at the Electronic Entertainment Expo 2010. The device's launch price was about US$150, which didn't reach any retail stores in North America.

The Caanoo is not a direct competitor of handheld consoles like Nintendo DS or PlayStation Portable, but rather an alternative open source device. Because of that, any software that is compatible can be run without the need of creating custom firmware or other homebrew applications. This is the last open-source gaming device by GamePark Holdings, as they ceased production and development of gaming hardware to focus solely on software.

Hardware

Specifications
 SoC (System on a Chip): MagicEyes Pollux VR3520F
 CPU: ARM926EJ 533 MHz embedded on SoC (architecture version ARMv5TEJ)
 GPU: 3D hardware engine embedded on SoC (OpenGL ES 1.1 support)
 3D performance: 133M Texel/s and 1,33M Polygon/s 
 main RAM: 128 Mbytes DDR SDRAM 133 MHz (peak memory bandwidth: 533 Mbytes/s)
 video buffer: about 16 Mbytes of main RAM are reserved for the video/texture information
 Operating System: Linux based
 Flash memory: None (128 Mbytes reserved to the OS)
 Connection to PC: USB 2.0 High Speed through EXT Port
 USB Host: USB 1.1 standard socket
 Supports SD / SDHC memory cards (up to 32 Gigabytes)
 Accelerometer
 Vibration Motor
 High precision analog stick
 Display: 3.5 inch OLED 320×240 pixel (resistive touchscreen)
 Stereo audio DAC: Wolfson Microelectronics WM1800
 Embedded Microphone and stereo Loudspeakers
 Power: Internal 1850mAh Lithium Polymer Battery (approx. 5/6 hours game/video playback)
 Dimensions : 
 Weight : 
 WiFi via adapter (USB dongle – Purchased separately)
 Colors: Black/Blue, White

NB: the CPU embedded on Pollux has a good tolerance to overclocking (until 750 MHz the system shouldn't have problems, just a shorter battery autonomy.)

Not all CPU/SoC are created equal and these results are theoretical.  Some may not be able to push much past stock frequency.  Overclocking will vary between each Caanoo.

Games/Applications 

The Caanoo had only four commercial retail games:

Asura Cross
Propis
Rhythmos
Wiz Party

The Caanoo can run several applications that emulate consoles or computer systems, such as DrPocketSnes for the Super NES, GnGEO for the Neo-Geo, Hu-Go for the PC Engine, PCSX ReArmed for original PlayStation games, MAME4all for arcade games and Picodrive for the Mega Drive/Genesis and its add-ons, as well as freeware homebrew games/applications. These applications are created by the community itself and not by the manufacturers. Most, if not all of this software can be found at OpenHandhelds, a community-driven website.

Gamepark Holdings also had a website focused on downloadable content named FunGP. It sold commercial Caanoo and Wiz games, as well as some retro Arcade games. It has since ceased operations.

Caanoo is not compatible with software built for previous GPH devices (such as the GP2X Wiz) without an application to allow it to do so. A compatibility layer named Ginge allows for most software to be compatible, and most applications have already been ported.

Multimedia capability 
The Caanoo is a video player, an audio player, photo viewer and E-Book reader.

Video
 Container files: AVI
 Video formats: DivX, XviD, MPEG4
 Audio formats: MP3, WAV
 Maximum Resolution: 640×480 pixel
 Maximum Frame Rate: 30 frame/s
 Maximum Video Bitrate: 2500kbit/s
 Maximum Audio Bitrate: 384kbit/s
 Captions: SMI

Audio
 Audio formats: MP3, Ogg Vorbis, WAV
 Channels: Stereo
 Frequency Range: 20 Hz - 20 kHz
 Power output: ?
 Sample Resolution/Rate: 16bit/8–48 kHz, in 8bit/22 kHz

Photos
 Supports JPG, PNG, GIF, Bitmap File Formats

E-Books
 Supports txt files, it can also read pdf format through various apps.

External TV output 
The SoC Pollux embeds (besides to the primary LCD controller) an NTSC/PAL encoder with internal DAC to manage an external analog video signal (CVBS output: 720×480 or 720×576 pixel interlaced, respectively 60/50 Hz vertical sync and 15 kHz horizontal sync).

See also
Comparison of handheld game consoles
 GP2X F100/F200 - Predecessor device
 GP2X Wiz - Predecessor device
 Dingoo - Main competing Device
 Pandora (console), an open source handheld device
 DragonBox Pyra, successor of Pandora
 GCW Zero

References

External links
 Official Gamepark Holdings Homepage
 GP32x Community Website
 News on Caanoo exclusive game projects (in English)
 NewsWeeZ Caanoo News and Files (in English)
 PDRoms Caanoo News and Files (in English)
 Caanoo File Archive
 Spanish homebrew videogames community (GP32Spain)
 Caanoo Review
 GbaRL.it Caanoo Review (in Italian)
 Communauté Francophone Caanoo (In French)

ARM-based video game consoles
Seventh-generation video game consoles
Linux-based video game consoles
Products introduced in 2010
Handheld game consoles